Green v. America Online, Inc., 318 F.3d 465 (2003), was a case of the United States Court of Appeals for the Third Circuit, over the protections granted to Internet service providers from legal liability for tort offenses committed by their users.

Background
John Green was a regular participant in America Online (AOL) message boards. While perusing a chat room called  "Romance - New Jersey over 30," Green received a message from an anonymous user that transmitted a "punter" computer virus to his computer, causing a blue screen of death and causing him to lose five hours of work time. Green claimed that the anonymous user who infected his computer joined with a second anonymous user to brag about the damage to Green's computer and make false statements about his sexuality, causing defamation and emotional distress. 

Green copied chat transcripts, sent them to AOL, and tried to claim $400 in damages for lost computer time and unspecified monetary damages against the two anonymous users, known only as John Doe 1 and John Doe 2. Green also claimed that AOL's user agreement was a violation of his First Amendment rights because he was required to accept the agreement with no room for negotiation.

Opinion of the court
The case began at the U.S. District Court for New Jersey, which ruled against Green. He then appealed to the Third Circuit. The circuit court affirmed the lower court ruling, reasoning that Green may have been able to file a tort claim against the John Does for both damage to his computer and emotional distress but could not do so against AOL. The offending posts were found to be third-party "information" under Section 230 of the Communications Decency Act, for which the service provider has no legal liability. Per precedent in Zeran v. America Online, an Internet service provider is immune from tort claims arising from the behavior of its users. 

The circuit court also held that as a passive provider of a platform for third-party speech, AOL could not be considered the publisher of the content or accept the responsibilities of that role. The court also rejected Green's claim that the AOL user agreement violated his First Amendment rights because AOL is a private company and users like Green pay voluntarily to use the service. 

Green attempted to appeal to the United States Supreme Court, but his request for certiorari was denied.

Impact 
While previous rulings had clarified that Section 230 absolved service providers from legal liability for the speech-related offenses committed by their third-party users, this ruling addressed liability for tort offenses committed by users and found that Section 230 covers that type of transgression as well. While infecting someone's computer with a virus or malware can be a cause of legal action for compensatory and punitive damages, Green would have to pursue such a case against the unknown John Does and not against the hosting service, AOL.

References 

2003 in United States case law
United States Court of Appeals for the Third Circuit cases
Section 230 of the Communications Decency Act
AOL
United States defamation case law